Therkel Mathiassen (5 September 1892, in Favrbo, Denmark – 14 March 1967) was an archaeologist, anthropologist, cartographer, and ethnographer notable for his scientific study of the Arctic.

Mathiassen and Peter Freuchen took part in the Fifth Danish Thule Expedition led by Knud Rasmussen.  During his travels, Mathiassen gave out thimbles to local Inuit, thus earning the Inuktitut nickname, Tikkilik ("the one with the thimbles").  In 1922, Mathiassen began an archaeological investigation at a site he called "Naujan" (Naujaat); the first archaeological excavation in Canada's Arctic. This was also the second ever Thule culture archaeological excavation, following the 1916 Comer's Midden in North Greenland. Mathiassen was able to manually excavate through peat, sod, and gravel, portions of 12 sod houses and a kitchen-midden.

In 1929, Mathiassen worked on another midden archaeological excavation, and uncovered a Norse culture in Inugsuk, Greenland. Frederica de Laguna was his research assistant.

Mathiassen was a member of the initial Danish committee of Societas Arctica Scandinavica, dedicated to Scandinavian research in Arctic humanistic and natural sciences. He was a prolific author of works, which have later been described as monumental and as marking the beginning of the professional period in Arctic archaeology. His works of the 1920s and 1930s introduced the concept of the Thule culture but also dismissed the theory of a Stone Age people in Greenland as first described on a scientific basis by Ole Solberg in 1907. In the 1950s, the existence of such a people was established through the use of radiocarbon dating.

In 1932 he was awarded the Hans Egede Medal by the Royal Danish Geographical Society.

Partial bibliography

Notes

References

External links 
 Undated photo

1892 births
1967 deaths
Danish archaeologists
Danish explorers
Danish cartographers
20th-century Danish writers
Explorers of the Arctic
Scandinavian explorers of North America
Explorers of Canada
Inuit history
20th-century archaeologists
20th-century cartographers